Codonopsis pilosula, also known as Dangshen, is a perennial species of flowering plant in the bellflower family. It is native to Asia, where it grows in forests, meadows, and scrub.

Description
It has lateral branches with alternately arranged leaves and small branchlets with oppositely arranged leaves. The ovate leaves are up to  centimeters long and are usually coated with short hairs. Solitary flowers occur at the branch tips.

Uses

Traditional

The roots of C. pilosula are used in traditional Chinese medicine. They are a constituent of Radix Codonopsis, a mixture used in herbal medicine.

Medicinal
The traditional medicinal use of Dangshen has inspired medical studies investigating the root's capabilities to treat cardiovascular, pulmonary and digestive conditions. Research into the effect of Condonopsis pilosula extract on gastric ulcers in rats showed a reduction in gastric acid production and severity of stress induced ulcers.

Subspecies
There are 3 subspecies:
 Codonopsis pilosula subsp. handeliana
 Codonopsis pilosula subsp. pilosula
 Codonopsis pilosula subsp. tangshen  - widely cultivated

References

External links
 
 Codonopsis Plants, National Council for The Conservation of Plants and Gardens

Campanuloideae
Flora of Northeast Asia
Plants used in traditional Chinese medicine
Medicinal plants of Asia
Taxa named by Adrien René Franchet